Lanuza may refer to:
 Lanuza, a municipality of the Philippines
 Lanuza, a village in Spain